The 1979 Milan–San Remo was the 70th edition of the Milan–San Remo cycle race and was held on 17 March 1979. The race started in Milan and finished in San Remo. The race was won by Roger De Vlaeminck of the Gis Gelati team.

General classification

References

1979
1979 in road cycling
1979 in Italian sport
March 1979 sports events in Europe
1979 Super Prestige Pernod